Teliana Pereira was the defending champion, having won the previous event in 2013, but retired in the semifinals against Alberta Brianti.

Carina Witthöft won the title, defeating Brianti in the final, 6–0, 6–1.

Seeds

Main draw

Finals

Top half

Bottom half

External Links
 Main draw

L'Open Emeraude Solaire de Saint-Malo - Singles
L'Open Emeraude Solaire de Saint-Malo
L'Open 35 de Saint-Malo